Northeast is a 2005 Argentina-French drama-thriller film directed by Juan Diego Solanas. It was screened in the Un Certain Regard section at the 2005 Cannes Film Festival.

Cast

References

External links

2005 films
2005 drama films
2005 thriller drama films
Argentine thriller drama films
French thriller drama films
2000s Spanish-language films
2000s French-language films
Films directed by Juan Diego Solanas
2000s Argentine films
2000s French films
Spanish-language French films